Metro INOX Cinemas (formerly Metro Big Cinema (2008–2016), Metro Adlabs (2006–2008) and Metro Cinema (1938–2006)) is an Art Deco Heritage grade IIA multiplex Movie theatre in Mumbai, India built in 1938. It was built and originally run by Metro-Goldwyn-Mayer (MGM). The main architect of the cinema was Thomas W. Lamb of New York City, and D. W. Ditchburn (Senior partner of the architectural firm Ditchburn Mistry and Bhedwar) of Mumbai was the associate architect.
It was one of the main sites targeted in the 2008 Mumbai attacks.

History

Metro is located in the Dhobitalao area of Mumbai. The Art Deco cinema opened on 5 June 1938, and initially exhibited movies made by MGM. The interior, floors, walls, ceilings as well as the furniture, was in shades of red and pink. Patrons were serviced by liveried ushers in the marble foyer and staircases, which led up to murals by students of the J. J. School of Art, under Charles Gerard. In 1955 Metro was the venue for the first Filmfare Awards night.

In 1970, the cinema was taken over by the Gupta family and with Indianisation came the era of screening Hindi films.

It soon became Bollywood's most famous red-carpet theatre. The Indian star presence at Metro became so prominent that riot police were often called in at film premieres.

Transformation into multiplex

Despite such achievements, Metro could not stand up to the multiplex invasion, it was becoming difficult to fill up the 1,491 seats. The promoters decided to transform the old cinema into a multiplex, while also restoring its original art-deco interiors. The cinema was acquired by Adlabs Cinemas and in the start of 2005, the cinema closed down.

The cinema re-opened after renovation in August 2006, screening the Karan Johar film “Kabhi Alvida Na Kehna”. The cinema now has six screens, which are among the largest multiplex screens in Mumbai.

References

External links
At Metro Cinema junction, no more darting through traffic

Cinemas in Mumbai
Art Deco architecture in India
Thomas W. Lamb buildings
Buildings and structures completed in 1938
1938 establishments in India